Krušedol Selo is a village in Serbia. It is located in the Irig municipality, in the Srem District, Vojvodina province. The village has a Serb ethnic majority and its population numbering 388 people (2002 census). It lies on the southeast slopes of Fruška gora mountain. At the close vicinity, there is a village of Krušedol Prnjavor; together, they are often referred to as just "Krušedol".

Historical population

1961: 606
1971: 542
1981: 424
1991: 372

See also
List of places in Serbia
List of cities, towns and villages in Vojvodina

References
Slobodan Ćurčić, Broj stanovnika Vojvodine, Novi Sad, 1996.
}

External links 

Krušedol Selo

Populated places in Syrmia